Mount Marcy (Mohawk: Tewawe’éstha) is the highest point in New York, with an elevation of .  It is located in the Town of Keene in Essex County. The mountain is in the heart of the Adirondack High Peaks region of the High Peaks Wilderness Area. Its stature and expansive views make it a popular destination for hikers, who crowd its summit in the summer months.

Lake Tear of the Clouds, at the col between Mounts Marcy and Skylight, is often cited as the highest source of the Hudson River, via Feldspar Brook and the Opalescent River, even though the main stem of the Opalescent River has as its source a higher point two miles north of Lake of the Clouds, and that stem is a mile longer than Feldspar Brook.

History 
The mountain is known as Tewawe'éstha ("it pierces") in Mohawk and Tahawus ("cloud-splitter") in Algonquin.

The mountain was named after Gov. William L. Marcy, the 19th-century Governor of New York, who authorized the environmental survey that explored the area.  Its first recorded ascent was on August 5, 1837, by a large party led by Ebenezer Emmons looking for the source of the East Fork of the Hudson River. Today the summit may be reached by multiple trails. Though a long hike by any route, a round-trip can be made in a day.

Vice President (and former governor) Theodore Roosevelt was at his hunting camp, Tahawus, on September 14, 1901, after summiting Marcy, when he was informed that President William McKinley, who had been shot a week earlier, had taken a serious turn for the worse.

Roosevelt and his party hiked ten miles (16 km) down the southwest face of the mountain to Newcomb, New York, where he hired a stage coach to take him to the closest train station at North Creek. At some point along the route, Roosevelt learned that McKinley had died, and so the new president took the train to Buffalo to be sworn in. The route from Newcomb to North Creek has been designated as the Roosevelt-Marcy Trail.

Routes 

Mount  Marcy is the tallest of the High Peaks of the Adirondack Mountains. The majority of the mountain is forested, although the final few hundred feet is above the tree line. The peak is dominated by rocky outcrops, lichens, and alpine shrubs. There are two plaques at the top commemorating the centennial of the first dated climb as well as the mountain summit itself.

The shortest and most frequently used route up the mountain is from the northwest, the Van Hoevenberg Trail, which starts at the Adirondak Loj near Heart Lake. From there it is 7.4 miles (11.2 km) to the summit, a lengthy 14.8-mile (22.4 km) roundtrip which can nevertheless be done in a day. A large section of the trail is suitable for alpine skiing and snowboarding.

The summit via the Johns Brook Trail from the Garden parking north of the mountain in Keene Valley is an 18-mile (28.8 km) round trip, which may be broken at Johns Brook Lodge.

A lengthier southern approach can be made from either of the two major trailheads for the southern High Peaks, Upper Works or Elk Lake.

Visibility on the summit occasionally affords very distant views of most of the Monteregian Hills volcano chain in Quebec's St Lawrence valley as far north as Mont St Hilaire. Views of Burlington and Lake Champlain adorn the surrounding Green Mountains with visibility extending far beyond the Southern Adirondacks  as well.

Climate
Mount Marcy has a warm-summer humid continental climate (Dfb) as defined by the Köppen climate classification system. Episodes of extreme cold and wind can occur with wind chill values below .

Ecology

According to the A. W. Kuchler U.S. potential natural vegetation types, Mount Marcy would have a dominant vegetation type of Northeastern Spruce/Fir (96) with a dominant vegetation form of Northern Conifer Forest (22). The spring bloom typically peaks around May 30 and fall color usually peaks around September 19.

Gallery

See also

List of mountain peaks of North America
List of mountain peaks of the United States
List of U.S. states by elevation
Adirondack Park
High Peaks Wilderness Area

References

External links

Mount Marcy hike and trip report. June 2010.

Mountains of Essex County, New York
Hudson River
Adirondack High Peaks
Highest points of U.S. states
Mountains of New York (state)
North American 1000 m summits